Davanagere railway station, formerly Davangere railway station (station code: DVG) is a railway station in Davanagere, state of Karnataka, India. It is one of the major railway stations in the South Western Railway zone of Indian Railways. The station is situated on P.B. road in Davanagere, exactly opposite to the city municipal corporation. It was created during the British rule and was renovated recently.. Amenities inside station include free Google Wifi, filtered water facility, refreshment stalls and retiring rooms.

Statistics 
 Station Name: Davanagere
 Indian Railway Station Code: DVG
 Number of platforms: 2

References

External links
 Davangere railway station on IndianTrains.org

Railway stations in Davanagere district
Davangere
Mysore railway division